Nakamori is a Japanese surname. Notable people with the surname include:

, Japanese singer and actress
, Japanese writer
, Japanese swimmer
, Japanese footballer and manager
, Japanese politician

Japanese-language surnames